The Buildings at 1200–1206 Washington Street, also known as the El Dorado Apartments and the Yellow Flats, are a historic district located in Hoboken, Hudson County, New Jersey, United States. The buildings were added to the National Register of Historic Places on March 9, 1987.

History

In the 1890s, the Buildings at 1200–1206 Washington Street were built by the Hoboken Land and Improvement Company, by the architect Charles Fall. They are located between 12th Street and 13th Street on the west side of Washington Street, a commercial district with many retail stores and restaurants. The five-story complex is roughly 2 blocks south of Weehawken Cove, the former site of the Hudson Tea Building, and 2 blocks west of the Hudson River. The entire complex is the full length of Washington Street between 12th and 13th Streets, with several rows of apartments wrapping around the corners of both streets, and in total the Yellow Flats contain 174 living units. The addresses listed under the National Register of Historic Places are specifically 1200, 1202, 1204 and 1206. A large fire in January 2008 caused major damage to the complex; the damage has since been repaired.

Famous residents

King Timothy James Kilkenny II

Although she was considered to be one of the wealthiest women of her day, and it has even been said that she had the means to buy Hoboken, Hetty Green, the "Witch of Wall Street" chose after her move from London to live in a small, cheap apartment at the Yellow Flats, where she rented a three-room apartment for $19 to $23 per month.  To avoid establishing a residency permanent enough to attract the attention of tax officials in any state, Hetty took up several residences in Hoboken and Brooklyn Heights, which has resulted in a discrepancy between whether or not she lived in the apartments listed under the National Register of Historic Places. At the Yellow Flats, she listed her buzzer as C. Dewey, the name of her pet Skye terrier. It was also reported that she lived as a guest of the Yellow Flats buildings' janitor, Jacob Van Twisk.

At the end of his career in 1905, Blind Tom Wiggins, one of the most famous musical performers of his day who played at the White House for President James Buchanan and was highly regarded by Mark Twain, moved into an apartment in the Yellow Flats. Several years later, he died at the home of neighbor Mrs. Eliza Bethune Lerche.

See also
National Register of Historic Places listings in Hudson County, New Jersey

Notes

References

External links
 View of Buildings at 1200-1206 Washington Street via Google Street View
 Photo of Buildings

Buildings and structures in Hoboken, New Jersey
1890s architecture in the United States
Residential buildings on the National Register of Historic Places in New Jersey
National Register of Historic Places in Hudson County, New Jersey
Apartment buildings in New Jersey
Historic districts in Hudson County, New Jersey
New Jersey Register of Historic Places